The Leicestershire County Cup is an annual rugby union knock-out club competition organized by the Leicestershire Rugby Union.  It was first introduced in 1890 with the inaugural winners being South Wigston.  The competition was known as the Leicestershire League Cup until 1893 when it was changed to Leicestershire Senior Cup.  The first competition was open to the top sides in the county apart from the Leicester FC first XV, who were considered too strong and would instead enter an 'A' team up until 1906.  Smaller clubs in the county, as well as senior club second sides, played in the Leicestershire Junior Cup which had its inaugural competition three seasons earlier in 1887.

The Senior Cup was discontinued after the 1926-27 season as it lost its appeal with the clubs involved.  Clubs would instead take part in the LRU 7-a-side competition which was introduced for the following year.  Rather confusingly the winners of this competition would be rewarded with the Rolleston Charity Cup - another Leicestershire club competition, also discontinued that year - while the runners up would receive the Senior Cup.  This seven-a-side competition would continue until 1979.

A proper 15-a-side county cup competition would not be introduced until the 1970-71 season when a format was recommended by Westleigh Rugby Club - a parent club of Leicester Lions.  This new competition was first known as the 'Westleigh Cup' and was won by Stoneygate.  The following season the cup would be known by its present name, the Leicestershire County Cup and up until the 2004-05 season would be a qualification method for clubs in the county for the English National Cup competition (now Anglo-Welsh Cup).

The Leicestershire County Cup is currently the premier county cup competition for club sides based in Leicestershire that typically play in tier 5 (National League 3 Midlands) to tier 7 (Midlands 2 East (North)/Midlands 2 East (South)) of the  English rugby union league system - although teams in lower ranked regional leagues have also taken part.  The current format is a knock-out competition with a first round, quarter finals, semi finals (held at neutral venues) and final (held at Welford Road).  There is also a Leicestershire Bowl competition for lower ranked clubs (tier 8 and below) that are not taking part in the County Cup.

Leicestershire County Cup winners

Number of wins

Syston (9)
Hinckley (8)
Loughborough Students (7)
South Leicester (7)
Belgrave (5)
Westleigh (5)
Leicester A (5)
Leicester Lions (3) 
Oadby Wyggestonian (3) 
Stoneygate (3)
Vipers (3)
Aylestone St James (2)
Leicester Crusaders (2)
Melton Mowbray (2)
South Wigston (2)
Belgrave Premier Works (1)
Burfield Rangers (1)
Granville (1)
Leicester Swifts (1)
Lutterworth (1)
Market Bosworth (1)
Medway Athletic (1)
Wigston (1)

Notes

See also
 Leicestershire RU
 English rugby union system
 Rugby union in England

References

External links
 Leicestershire RFU

Recurring sporting events established in 1890
1890 establishments in England
Rugby union cup competitions in England
Rugby union in Leicestershire